The Delacroix Monument (French: Monument à Delacroix) is a memorial to the French artist Eugène Delacroix (1798-1863).  It is located in the Jardin du Luxembourg, in Paris, France, on the north side of the garden, just east of the Orangerie du Sénat. It was created by the French sculptor Aimé-Jules Dalou and unveiled in 1890.

History 
In 1884, a group of leading artists, critics, writers and politicians proposed the creation of a monument that would honor Delacroix. To create the monument, they chose the well-known French sculptor Aimé-Jules Dalou.

Description 
The monument is an allegorical display of four figures.  At the bottom Apollo, God of Poetry and Music, applauds as a winged old man, representing Time, lifts up a woman, representing Fame, to present a wreath of renown and immortality to the fourth figure, Delacroix.

References 

French artists
Monuments and memorials by city